Carcina is a moth genus of the family Depressariidae.

Species
 Carcina quercana (Fabricius, 1775) - oak long-horned flat-body
 Carcina luridella (Christoph, 1882)
 Carcina haemographa Meyrick, 1937

References

Peleopodinae
Moth genera
Taxa named by Jacob Hübner